The Soft Moon is the debut studio album by American post-punk band the Soft Moon. It was released on November 16, 2010 by Captured Tracks. The album was recorded over the span of a year in frontman Luis Vasquez's apartment. Writing, composition, recording, production and album art are credited to Vasquez. Vasquez commented on the album in an interview with Fact: "The first LP was more spontaneous and less focused mainly because the songs were never intended to reach the public’s ears. Each song was just a different way to reach inside myself and pull out memories from the past." The album was well received upon its release.

Track listing

References

2010 debut albums
The Soft Moon albums
Captured Tracks albums